Terence Bosson is an English wrestler. Bosson won a silver medal for England at the 2010 Commonwealth Games in the Men's Greco-Roman 60 kg.

See also
England at the 2010 Commonwealth Games

References

British male sport wrestlers
Living people
Commonwealth Games silver medallists for England
Commonwealth Games medallists in wrestling
Wrestlers at the 2010 Commonwealth Games
Year of birth missing (living people)
Medallists at the 2010 Commonwealth Games